The University of Lethbridge Community Stadium is a multi-sports venue in Lethbridge, Alberta, Canada.

It was built in a partnership between the city of Lethbridge and the University of Lethbridge with additional funding from the province of Alberta.

References 

 

Soccer venues in Canada
Sports venues in Lethbridge